A , sometimes referred to as an ordinary motorcycle, is one of the vehicle categories in the Road Traffic Act of Japan. Such vehicles (motorcycles) have a displacement of more than 50 cc but no more than 400 cc.

Overview
A standard two-wheel motor vehicle can be operated with an ordinary motorcycle license or a heavy motorcycle license.
It is defined in the Road Traffic Act's Enforcement Regulations as a "two-wheeled vehicle (including one with a side car) other than a large special vehicle, heavy motorcycle and small special vehicle".

Three-wheeled vehicles are treated as ordinary vehicles, and are not classed as motorcycles. However, the safety standard for motorcycles is applied to a three-wheeled vehicle that has coaxial wheels with a width of less than 46 cm, where the body or wheels incline when turning.

License

A license to ride an ordinary motorcycle can be obtained from the age of 16 onward.

Categories
Some of the vehicle categories under Japanese law are as follows:

Other details

Gallery

See also
 Bōsōzoku

References

External links
  Information about acquiring a license (Japan Motorcycle Promotion & Safety Association)

Road transport in Japan
Japan